Harold "Harry" Alfred Jones (May 8, 1895 – December 24, 1956) was a Canadian sailor who competed in the 1932 Summer Olympics.

Jones was born in Oakland, California, United States. In 1932 he was a crew member of the Canadian boat Santa Maria which won the silver medal in the 8 metre class. He died in Vancouver.

References

External links
 
 
 

1895 births
1956 deaths
Sportspeople from Oakland, California
Sportspeople from Vancouver
American emigrants to Canada
Canadian male sailors (sport)
Olympic sailors of Canada
Olympic silver medalists for Canada
Sailors at the 1932 Summer Olympics – 8 Metre
Olympic medalists in sailing
Medalists at the 1932 Summer Olympics
20th-century Canadian people